Roy Henry Thorpe (December 13, 1874 – September 19, 1951) was an American salesman and Republican Party politician.

Early life and education 
He was born near Greensburg, Indiana, on December 13, 1874, and graduated from Greensburg High School. He studied pharmacy, medicine, and law.

Career 
As an evangelist, Thorpe was known as "the boy tramp orator of 1896". He worked as a salesman in Du Quoin, Illinois, from 1897 to 1904 and in Shenandoah, Iowa, from 1905 to 1919.

In 1919, Thorpe moved to Lincoln, Nebraska, still working as a salesman. On November 7, 1922, he was elected to the Sixty-seventh United States Congress to fill the seat left open by C. Frank Reavis who resigned to become a special war fraud prosecutor. He did not seek reelection in 1922, but attempted a comeback in 1924 but was defeated by John H. Morehead. He traveled as a sales organizer and later engaged in the insurance business.

Death 
He died in Lincoln on September 19, 1951, and is interred in Wyuka Cemetery.

References

External links

1874 births
1951 deaths
People from Greensburg, Indiana
Politicians from Lincoln, Nebraska
Republican Party members of the United States House of Representatives from Nebraska
People from Du Quoin, Illinois
People from Shenandoah, Iowa